North Riding Garages v Butterwick [1967] 2 QB 56 is a UK labour law case, concerning redundancy.

Facts
Mr Alexander Butterwick had been the car repairs shop manager for North Riding Garages for thirty years in Whitby, Yorkshire. He could not cope with new working methods introduced by the business owners who bought out the company in 1965. This involved more paper work and providing estimates to customers in advance.

Judgment
Lord Parker CJ, Glyn-Jones J and Widgery J in the Divisional Court reversed the Tribunal’s finding of redundancy. It held the garage continued to require a workshop manager, though one with different skills.

Notes

United Kingdom labour case law
Court of Appeal (England and Wales) cases
1967 in British law
1967 in case law